The University of Vavuniya (abbreviated UoV) is a public university in the city of Vavuniya in Sri Lanka. In June 2021, the Government of Sri Lanka announced the creation of a new state university by converting the Vavuniya Campus of the University of Jaffna into the University of Vavuniya.

History
In 1991, the Northern Province Affiliated University College (NPAUC) was established in Vavuniya to offer courses in mathematical sciences, accountancy and finance. A gazette was issued on 26 March 1997 upgrading the NPAUC to the Vavuniya campus of the University of Jaffna.

Organisation and Administration

Academic Entities 
 Faculty of Business Studies
 Department of Finance and Accountancy
 Department of English Language Teaching
 Department of Project Management
 Department of Human Resource Management
 Department of Marketing Management
 Department of Business Economics
 Department of Management and Entrepreneurship
 Faculty of Applied Sciences
 Department of Physical Science
 Department of Bio Science
 Faculty of Technological Studies
 Department of Information and Communication Technology

Officers

Chancellor 
Chancellor is the head of the university and is responsible for awarding all the academic degrees. Usually, the chancellor is a distinguished person in an academic discipline. Otherwise, it is a distinguished person or a clergy in the civil society. The appointment is done by the head of the state, the President of Sri Lanka. The position is mainly ceremonial and duties are usually carried out by the vice chancellor.

Vice-Chancellor 
The vice-chancellor is the principal academic and administrative officer of the university, responsible for the management tasks. This appointment is also done by the President of Sri Lanka.

Deputy Vice Chancellor

Dean of Faculty 
Deans are the heads of the faculties. They are responsible for the management and the tasks carried out by the faculty. Deans are appointed by the chancellor for three years.
 Faculty of Business Studies
 Faculty of Applied Sciences
 Faculty of Technological Studies

Other officers
 Registrar:
 Librarian:
 Bursar:

Former Chancellors

Student Life

Student organizations 
Students of University of Vavuniya runs the following clubs:

Sports and Recreation 
The Department of Physical Education caters to the student population of the university in sports. The department gives the students sports facilities in two ways:
 Students who wish to play games only for fun and those who wish to use the facilities for fitness may use the Sports Center and the Gym
 The department conducts a regular programme for 18 sports: athletics, badminton, basketball, carom, chess, cricket, elle, football, karate, netball, rowing, rugby football, table tennis, taekwondo, tennis, volleyball, weightlifting and wrestling. The department gives the facilities necessary for these sports and supplies qualified coaches for most of the games. The aim in this regular programme is to participate in the annual inter-university and national championships.

See also 
 Education in Sri Lanka
 Sri Lankan universities

References

External links
 University of Vavuniya : www.vau.jfn.ac.lk  (New site under construction)

2021 establishments in Sri Lanka
University of Vavuniya
Educational institutions established in 2021
Statutory boards of Sri Lanka
Universities in Sri Lanka